PEI (Produits Equipements Industriels) is a monthly French magazine launched in 1989 for industry professionals. It is published by Thomas Industrial Media, a subsidiary of Thomas Industrial media BVBA whose offices are located in Mechelen, Belgium.

Informations 
10 times a year, PEI, provides a digest of the latest products news and technologies available on the French market.
In 2009, nearly 45 700 subscribers received PEI, mostly engineers and purchasing managers. PEI also publishes newsletters and updates its website with daily news about new products and services available to the French market.

PEI is published in Super A4 format since 2009, in a new style and with an enriched content. It covers articles on latest technologies, interviews and views from market leaders, application stories as well as industry news.

The headquarters of the publication is in Boulogne Billancourt, Hauts-de-Seine, France.

Thomas Industrial Media is the French subsidiary of Thomas Industrial media BVBA also present in Germany, Italy and Turkey.
Thomas Industrial media BVBA publishes as well other industrial publications and websites across Europe.

In English and distributed all across Europe:
 Industrial Engineering News (IEN)
 Processing and Control News (PCN)
 Power In Motion (PIM)
In German and distributed in Germany:
 Technische Revue (TR)
In Italian and distributed in Italy:
 IEN Italia
 Manutenzione Tecnica e Management
 Il Distributore Industriale
In Turkish and distributed in Turkey:
 Endustri Dunyasi

Circulation 
The magazine is free and available only on request for industry professionals. Over 45 100 copies are distributed ten times a year.

External links
 PEI's website

1989 establishments in France
Magazines published in France
French-language magazines
Magazines established in 1989
Monthly magazines published in France
Free magazines
Mass media in Mechelen
Multilingual magazines